This is a list of butterflies of Tunisia. About 84 species are known from Tunisia.

Hesperiidae
Carcharodus lavatherae
Carcharodus stauderi
Carcharodus tripolina
Gegenes nostrodamus
Gegenes pumilio
Spialia sertorius
Thymelicus acteon
Thymelicus hamza

Papilionidae
Iphiclides podalirius
Papilio machaon
Papilio saharae
Zerynthia rumina

Pieridae
Anthocharis euphenoides
Aporia crataegi
Colias croceus
Colotis chrysonome
Colotis evagore
Euchloe ausonia
Euchloe belemia
Euchloe charlonia
Euchloe falloui
Gonepteryx cleopatra
Gonepteryx rhamni
Pieris brassicae
Pieris napi
Pieris rapae
Pontia daplidice
Pontia glauconome

Lycaenidae
Aricia cramera
Azanus ubaldus
Callophrys avis
Callophrys rubi
Celastrina argiolus
Cigaritis myrmecophilia
Cigaritis siphax
Cigaritis zohra
Glaucopsyche alexis
Glaucopsyche melanops
Kretania allardii
Kretania martini
Lampides boeticus
Leptotes pirithous
Lycaena phlaeas
Lysandra punctifera
Polyommatus icarus
Pseudophilotes abencerragus
Satyrium esculi
Tarucus rosacea
Tarucus theophrastus
Tomares ballus
Tomares mauretanicus
Virachola livia
Zizeeria karsandra

Nymphalidae
Argynnis pandora
Berberia abdelkader
Berberia lambessanus
Charaxes jasius
Chazara briseis
Coenonympha arcanioides
Coenonympha fettigii
Coenonympha pamphilus
Danaus chrysippus
Hipparchia aristaeus
Hipparchia ellena
Hipparchia fidia
Hipparchia hansii
Hipparchia statilinus
Issoria lathonia
Lasiommata megera
Libythea celtis
Maniola jurtina
Melanargia galathea
Melanargia ines
Melitaea aetherie
Melitaea deserticola
Melitaea didyma
Nymphalis polychloros
Pararge aegeria
Polygonia c-album
Pyronia bathseba
Pyronia cecilia
Pyronia janiroides
Vanessa atalanta
Vanessa cardui

See also
Wildlife of Tunisia

References

Tunisia

Tunisia
Tunisia
Butterflies